Davide Pizzoli (born 11 September 1999) is an Italian motorcycle racer. He has competed in the FIM CEV Moto3 Junior World Championship, the Moto3 World Championship and the Supersport World Championship.

Career statistics

Grand Prix motorcycle racing

By season

By class

Races by year
(key) (Races in bold indicate pole position; races in italics indicate fastest lap)

Supersport World Championship

Races by year
(key) (Races in bold indicate pole position; races in italics indicate fastest lap)

References

External links

Italian motorcycle racers
Living people
1999 births
Moto3 World Championship riders
Supersport World Championship riders
Sportspeople from Rome